Bass Rock is the second EP by American recording artist Clyde Carson on Moe Doe Entertainment released on July 21, 2009. A member of Bay Area The Team and a solo artist as well, Clyde devoted a lot of his time to the Team, but still did work on his own. The guest appearances on the album are The Jacka, Prozak, and Soni.

Background

As one of the most anticipated rap artists from the Bay, Clyde went into his own career by signing with Capitol Records while still being able to release independent projects.

Track listing

 All production, writing, and track listing credits provided by Discogs.com, except track 6 which comes from cduniverse.

Personnel

All credits adapted from AllMusic.

 Bedrock – producer
 Clyde Carson – executive producer, primary artist
 Cookin Soul – producer
 Jason "Jay E" Epperson – producer
 Prozack Turner – featured artist
 Soni – featured artist
 Street Symphony – producer
 The Jacka – featured artist
 Jacob Tupolo – composer
 Zac – producer

References

External links

 Album Lyrics

2009 EPs